Vladimir Roslik (c. 1941 – c. 1984) was a doctor arrested and killed during the Uruguayan military dictatorship of 1973–1985.

He was the last victim to die under torture during this dictatorship prior to the return of democracy in 1985.

Roslik was born and had died in San Javier, Río Negro. He studied medicine in the USSR, at the Patrice Lumumba University. Several monuments to him stand in his hometown.

Bibliography

External links 

 Inter-American Commission on Human Rights resolution regarding Roslik's torture and death.

1940s births
1980s deaths
People from Río Negro Department
20th-century Uruguayan physicians
Assassinated activists
Assassinated Uruguayan people
Uruguayan torture victims
People murdered in Uruguay
Uruguayan people of Russian descent
Communist Party of Uruguay politicians
Peoples' Friendship University of Russia alumni
Uruguayan expatriates in the Soviet Union
1984 murders in Uruguay